Yusufpur Mohammadabad is a town and a Township in Ghazipur district in the Indian state of Uttar Pradesh. Haydaria village near Mohammadabad is the starting point of Purvanchal Expressway (Lucknow to Ghazipur).

Demographics
 India census, Mohammadabad had a population of 38,328. Males constitute 52% of the population and females 48%. Mohammadabad has an average literacy rate of 78.03%, higher than state average of 67.68%.: male literacy is 84.60%, and female literacy is 70.81%. In Mohammadabad, 14.73% of the population is under 6 years of age.

Muhammadabad market is famous for business. Yusufpur-Mohammadabad is a twin town in the Ghazipur district of Uttar Pradesh, India. This town is a business hub for other nearby districts like Ballia, Mau, and Buxar. Yusufpur has a railway station which lies on the railway line linking Varanasi to Chhapra via Ghazipur and Ballia in the North Eastern Railway Zone.

Overview
Mohammadabad is situated on the Ghazipur–Patna National Highway 19. It is also located beside the Ghazipur–Ballia state highway. Many of the politicians representing Ghazipur area belong to this town.

Notable personalities
Dr. Mukhtar Ahmed Ansari
Dr. Shivpujan Rai
Mangla Rai
Hari Narayan Singh
Rai
Sinha

Alka Rai
Dr. Najeebullah Khan
Dr. Sri Govind Rai, medical practitioner and social worker

References

Cities and towns in Ghazipur district